is a Japanese manga created by Haruaki Katō. It started serialization on Flex Comix's free web comic FlexComix Blood on July 12, 2006. An anime adaptation produced by Nippon Animation was first aired in October 2008 in Japan. An OVA was released on October 17, 2009.

Plot
Its storyline focuses on the comedic school life of the four main heroines, Torako Kageyama, Ayumi Nonomura, Tatsuki Iizuka, and Suzume Saotome. As the plot progresses, Torako and her friends gradually begin to learn and interact with their classmates in Class 1–6, in which each student has a unique and extraordinary personality.

Characters

Main heroines

Each name of the four main heroines contains a kanji of the Four Symbols in the Chinese constellation.

Outgoing and usually the instigator of the pack, she is identifiable by the fact that she does not wear a blazer over her shirt and tie like most other characters. She's a typical trouble-maker, who likes to achieve her objectives in a straightforward and intuitive manner and doesn't really seem to mind other people's circumstances. Because she was absent during the first few days of school, she was unwittingly assigned as a member of the discipline committee. She has an older brother Kitsune, whom she apparently holds in very low regard, and an older sister Oniyuri. It is later revealed that Torako is actually a half sister of Kitsune and Oniyuri. Torako used to live with her biological mother until she died of a disease when Torako was attending elementary school. She was then brought to her father's family by him, a decision to which Torako and her stepmother disapproved at first. Due to this reason, she does not have a good relationship with her current family. So much so that she runs away from her home whenever she has a quarrel with her family. However, Kitsune explains that it is always her half-sister Oniyuri's kindness that brings Torako back to the family. She's Suzume's childhood friend. Despite her tendency to skip classes, she still receives above average grades in tests as she is actually quite intelligent. She's 164 cm tall and her three sizes are 81-55-82.

Daughter to the corporate president of E-lectra, one of the biggest electronics companies in Japan. She lives in a modest looking house with a housemaid, separate from her parents due to her father's work. Ever the classy one, she tends to use honorific speech even towards her closest friends and is often annoyed by Torako's mischief. Nonetheless, she has the tendency of ending up being taken along, forcefully or otherwise, with the other main heroines over the resulting shenanigans.

Suzume has been Torako's close friend since the middle school. She is usually very quiet but possesses monstrous strength and huge appetite. Despite her superior athletic ability, able to best her homeroom teacher in a one on one dodgeball match, she is in distress for looking childish and not feminine enough. In fact, she does not wear a bra and does admire Tatsuki for wearing underwears for grown ups. She also cannot swim. She seems to have no sense of shame and her behavior is very unpredictable, which often throws her friends off balance. Whenever Torako runs away from her home, Suzume always accompanies her.

Popular among boys for having a large bust and a naive personality, her photos are always in high demand. Due to her extreme shyness, she has had trouble making friends ever since the middle school and is most often the victim of practical jokes and mischief by others. From meeting Torako and the others Ayumi has then become more extroverted and out spoken but still keeps her shy nature intact. Ayumi also tends to run into Torako's older brother, Kitsune, resulting in him either being rarely nice to her or saying something perverted. Her three sizes are 90-56-85.

Class 1-6
The following characters are classmates of the four main heroines:

President of Class 1-6, she often attempts to participate in activities above and beyond her call of duty in hope of paving her way to becoming the future head of the student council. Openly bisexual, she is known for frequent sexual harassment, though she usually targets other females more than males. She takes a particular liking to Torako as well as Ayumi and doesn't really seem to mind being called a pervert. She has an older brother, who has a similar personality.

With a personality that doesn't conform well with authorities and the habit of wearing T-shirts instead of the standard shirt and tie, Ushio is speculated to be a juvenile delinquent although she firmly denies being one. She likes pudding as well as cats and is tone deaf as revealed when she first went to Karaoke with Torako. She has an older brother. She has often been seen in the company of Minato Oba, despite their clashing personalities.

Often spotted alongside Yanagi Kyōgoku taking photographs of students and then selling them for profit, she is identifiable for wearing a large number of small decorative accessories. She speaks Kansai ben for no apparent reason. She has a younger brother and two younger sisters.

Befitting the stereotype of a scientist and an engineer, this girl with long braided hair wears glasses and more often than not white lab coat over her uniform. She is a member of the robotics club, and her hobby is creating grotesque robots. Her desire is to work for the E-lectra Corporation in the future.

Despite being actually quite pretty, her apparent lack of know-how for doing her own make-up means most of her face is not really visible as it is hidden behind her long hair, creating an image akin to that of a stereotypical female ghost in Japanese horror videos. She has a younger sister named Iori.

Minato is a tall, blonde girl with a tanned complexion reminiscent of the Ganguro style, and also has a more developed bust than the other girls. Despite her mature appearance, she has a very child-like personality which causes her to become teary-eyed over the most trivial of matters. She also maintains an unusual level of childish innocence, causing her to interpret things differently than the other students and at times be almost helpless doing the simplest of tasks. When she receives help from other students, she will persistently and excessively try to return the favor back to the person usually well beyond the norm, and almost completely attaching to them. She is often seen in the company of Ushio Makunouchi, often hanging on her or giving her trouble with her childish personality.

Tōma is a bookworm and wears glasses. She tends to be a loner who prefers sleeping on the bench by herself in a quiet and beautiful garden for solitude introspection. Although she is easily annoyed by Torako's interference and she seems to dislike Torako on the surface, she is actually a good friend of Torako. She and Torako made a promise of becoming mutual friends when they made a visit to the Kamizono Academy and met each other by chance. The OVA implies she may have a deeper (possibly romantic) affection towards Torako. Tōma has an older sister.

Hitsugi is an 11-year-old girl who transferred from the elementary division of the school for her being a mathematics and science prodigy. However, she is not very good at subjects that require memorization. She is very vulnerable to jokes, even the most boring ones. Her favorite snack is Yōkan. She refers to herself with the masculine pronoun , a rare occurrence among females.

Upper classmates

Shishimaru is a second-year student, and a member of the Kendo club, who has a crush on Torako. One of the Four Deities of Kamizono. Like most other characters in the series, his first name makes reference to an animal, in his case, the Lion (Shishi), while his surname, as with the other Deities, references to historical eras in Japan.

Yanagi is Shishimaru's friend. Just like Koma, his hobby is to profit by selling photographs of students that he has taken. He was given a nickname "Photoshop".

Torako's older brother, who has been bullying his sister since childhood. Among the students, Kitsune is known to be an 'Extreme Sadist'. Despite being Torako's brother, he seems to have no resemblance to her in terms of both appearance and personality. Denote Master Servant relationship. He wears a safety pin on his left ear like an earring contrasted by the silver clip Torako wears and a silver bell Oniyuri wears both on their left ears. Because of his Extreme Sadism personality and practice, he views Ayumi to be the perfect target of torment, as he often lifts up her skirt or asks if he can. He seems to prefer torturing her and Torako. He and Ayumi also tend to run into each other randomly, with Kitsune either doing something nice to her(such as giving her his fox mask at the festival or splitting an ice cream with her) or saying something perverted. However, one can't deny that his usual pace gets disrupted when it comes to Ayumi. It is stated that whenever he torments Torako, Suzume doesn't help because Kitsune bribes her with snacks, thus Suzume likes him.

Torako's older sister. She is the head of the student council, and excels others in every ways. Despite being strict to her younger sister, she is actually being extremely overprotective of Torako. Nene has a great admiration for Oniyuri as she wants to also become the head of the student council in the future.

Teachers

He is the teacher in charge of class 1-6. He is considered as a delinquent teacher by the students. He is a heavy smoker and is often seen smoking in the school. Although he's doing his best to maintain cynical personality, he is easily influenced by other students.

Taiga is the school's principal, whose face has not been revealed yet as it has always been shadowed by a backlight. He is portrayed as a middle-aged gentleman with a mustache.

Other supporting characters

Yuki is Hitsugi's friend, who attends the elementary division of Kamizono Academy. Her brother is in the Academy's high-school. They appear together in a photo on a New Year's greeting card sent to Tatsuki, glimpsed in episode 6.

Media

Manga
Hyakko began as a manga series written and drawn by Haruaki Katō and began its serialization in FlexComixBlood. Currently, six volumes have been published by Flex Comix in Japan. As of March 20, 2012, the series is currently on hiatus.

Anime
Directed by Michio Fukuda, and written by Yoshihiko Tomizawa, an anime adaptation was produced by Nippon Animation. The anime series consisted of 13 episodes and initially aired in Japan between October 1 and December 31, 2008. The show was broadcast on TV Aichi, TV Osaka, and TV Tokyo. An OVA was released on October 17, 2009. Right Stuf Inc. licensed the series in North America and released it on DVD under their Lucky Penny label on April 2, 2013.

Episode list

Visual novel
A visual novel based on the anime named Hyakko: Yorozuya Jikenbo! was released on April 9, 2009 for PlayStation 2. It was published by 5pb., and it was released in two editions: regular and limited.

References

External links
Official Anime Website 
TV Tokyo's Official Anime Website 
Hyakko Blog 
Yahoo! Comic's Website for Hyakko 

2007 manga
2008 anime television series debuts
2009 anime OVAs
Comedy anime and manga
FlexComix Blood and FlexComix Next manga
Japanese webcomics
Nippon Animation
School life in anime and manga
Shōnen manga
Slice of life anime and manga
Webcomics in print